Mitoscelis is a monotypic genus of  long-jawed orb-weavers containing the single species, Mitoscelis aculeata. It was first described by Tamerlan Thorell in 1890 from a female found on Java.

See also
 List of Tetragnathidae species

References

Monotypic Araneomorphae genera
Spiders of Asia
Taxa named by Tamerlan Thorell
Tetragnathidae